Phalaris is a genus of grasses. Various species of Phalaris grow on every continent except Antarctica. They can be found in a broad range of habitats from below sea level to thousands of feet above sea level and from wet marshy areas to dry places. P. arundinacea and P. aquatica are sometimes invasive species in wetlands.

Alkaloids
Some Phalaris species contain gramine, which, in sheep and to a lesser extent in cattle, is toxic and can cause brain damage, other organ damage, central nervous system damage, and death.

Phalaris arundinacea, Phalaris aquatica, and Phalaris brachystachys are known to contain the alkaloids DMT, 5-MeO-DMT, and 5-OH-DMT (bufotenin). Some research has been done into the variability of alkaloids in the Phalaris grasses.  Strains with high levels of alkaloids are best avoided in locations with grazing cattle and sheep, due to potential toxicity. Such high-alkaloid strains include Phalaris aquatica AQ-1 and the species P. brachystachys. Seasonal and weather patterns also appear to affect alkaloid concentration, as most toxicity occurs in autumn and in times of drought.  Regrowth after grazing or mowing also shows a considerable increase in alkaloids.

In June 2018, mobs of wild kangaroos were observed suffering from "phalaris staggers" which causes head tremors, a loss of co-ordination and collapse. When phalaris is used to feed livestock, farmers can administer cobalt to their animals or spray it on their pastures to protect animals against the effects of phalaris. However, this treatment is not available to wild kangaroos and they suffer from poisoning due to the alkaloids. The staggers syndrome is more common in livestock in areas with limestone soils, which contain less cobalt than basalt soils.

None of the above alkaloids is said to have been found in P. californica, P. canariensis, P. minor and hybrids of P. arundinacea together with P. aquatica.

Uses
Some species are used in dried flower arrangements. Phalaris canariensis is commonly used for birdseed.

Phalaris arundinacea is also being trialled as a potential bioenergy crop in Ireland.

Species
Species include:
Phalaris amethystina Trin.
Phalaris angusta - timothy canarygrass	
Phalaris aquatica - bulbous canarygrass, Harding grass, Hardinggrass (syn. Phalaris tuberosa)
Phalaris arundinacea - reed canary grass, reed canarygrass	
Phalaris brachystachys - shortspike canarygrass	
Phalaris californica - California canarygrass	
Phalaris canariensis - annual canarygrass, common canary grass, common canarygrass	
Phalaris caroliniana - Carolina canarygrass, maygrass, see Eastern Agricultural Complex	
Phalaris coerulescens - sunolgrass	
Phalaris commutata
Phalaris elongata Braun-Blanq.
Phalaris lemmonii - Lemmon's canarygrass	
Phalaris minor - canarygrass, littleseed canarygrass	
Phalaris paradoxa - hood canarygrass
Phalaris platensis Henrard ex Wacht.
Phalaris truncata Guss. ex Bertol.

References

External links
 USDA Plants Database
 Grass Genera of the World 
 Jepson Manual Treatment
 Erowid Phalaris Vault
 The genus Phalaris in Ayahuasca

Psychedelic tryptamine carriers
Forages
 
Poaceae genera
Taxa named by Carl Linnaeus